Reidville may refer to:

 Reidville, Newfoundland and Labrador, Canada
 Reidville, South Carolina, United States

See also

 Readville
 Reedville (disambiguation)
 Reidsville (disambiguation)